Paekākāriki Hill  is a rural locality in Porirua in New Zealand's North Island. It is located inland, behind Paraparaumu and Raumati. Paekākāriki Hill Road runs approximately north to south from Paekākāriki to Pāuatahanui. Grays Road runs along the northern coast of Te Awarua-o-Porirua Harbour's Pauatahunui Arm, which forms the locality's southern boundary.

Paekākāriki Hill Road, built in 1849, was the main highway north until 1939. The road, which is now fully sealed, is narrow and winding. It has views of the coast.

The Battle of Battle Hill, part of the New Zealand Wars, was fought in the area in 1846.

Demographics

Paekākāriki Hill had a population of 375 at the 2018 New Zealand census, an increase of 12 people (3.3%) since the 2013 census, and an increase of 24 people (6.8%) since the 2006 census. There were 135 households. There were 192 males and 183 females, giving a sex ratio of 1.05 males per female. The median age was 45.2 years (compared with 37.4 years nationally), with 75 people (20.0%) aged under 15 years, 63 (16.8%) aged 15 to 29, 177 (47.2%) aged 30 to 64, and 60 (16.0%) aged 65 or older.

Ethnicities were 93.6% European/Pākehā, 10.4% Māori, 1.6% Pacific peoples, 4.0% Asian, and 3.2% other ethnicities (totals add to more than 100% since people could identify with multiple ethnicities).

The proportion of people born overseas was 20.8%, compared with 27.1% nationally.

Although some people objected to giving their religion, 64.0% had no religion, 28.0% were Christian, 1.6% were Hindu and 2.4% had other religions.

Of those at least 15 years old, 87 (29.0%) people had a bachelor or higher degree, and 36 (12.0%) people had no formal qualifications. The median income was $47,500, compared with $31,800 nationally. The employment status of those at least 15 was that 168 (56.0%) people were employed full-time, 48 (16.0%) were part-time, and 9 (3.0%) were unemployed.

References

Populated places in the Wellington Region
Suburbs of Porirua